Tristão de Alencar Araripe Júnior (27 June 1848 – 29 October 1911) was a Brazilian lawyer, literary critic, and writer.

Biography
Tristão de Alencar Araripe Júnior was born in Fortaleza, Ceará, the son of Tristão de Alencar Araripe and Argentina de Alencar Lima, into one of the country's most prominent families. In 1869, he graduated with the degree of Bachelor of Laws from Faculdade de Direito do Recife. Two years later he entered politics. Araripe Júnior was a founding member of the Brazilian Academy of Letters and the Instituto do Ceará. He was also associated with the Brazilian Historic and Geographic Institute.

Works
Fiction
 Contos Brasileiros (short stories, 1868). 
 A Casinha de Sapé (novel, 1872).
 O Ninho de Beija-flor (novel, 1874). 
 Jacina, a Marabá (novel, 1875). 
 Luizinha (novel, 1878). 
 O Reino Encantado (novel, 1878). 
 O Retirante (novel, 1878).
 Os Guaianás (novel, 1882). 
 Quilombo dos Palmares (1882). 
 Xico Melindroso (1882). 
 Miss Kate (novel, 1909). 
 O Cajueiro do Fagundes (novel, 1911).

Non-fiction
 Cartas sobre a Literatura Brasílica (1869). 
 O Papado (1874).
 Anchieta (1879).
 José de Alencar: Perfil Literário (1882). 
 Dirceu (1890). 
 Função Normal do Terror nas Sociedades Cultas (1891).
 Gregório de Matos (1893). 
 Deteriora Sequor (1894).
 Movimento Literário de 1893 (1896).
 Crepúsculo dos Povos (1896).
 Diálogo das Novas Grandezas do Brasil (1909).
 Pareceres (1911–1913).
 Ibsen e o Espírito da Tragédia (1911). 
 Obra Crítica de Araripe Júnior, ed. Afrânio Coutinho (5 vols., 1958–1966).

Notes

Further reading
 Blake, Augusto Victorino Alves Sacramento (1883). Diccionario Bibliographico Brazileiro. Rio de Janeiro: Imprensa Nacional.
 Cairo, L.R. (2000). "A Geração de 70 do Século XIX e a Construção da História da Literatura," Revista da Biblioteca Mário de Andrade, Vol. 58, p. 113–122.
 Coutinho, Afrânio (1959). Euclides, Capistrano e Araripe. Rio de Janeiro: MEC.
 Coutinho, Afrânio; Sousa, J. Galante de (2001). Enciclopedia de Literatura Brasileira. Rio de Janeiro: Fundação Biblioteca Nacional, Academia Brasileira de Letras.
 Couto, Pedro do (1906). Páginas de Crítica. Lisboa: Livraria Clássica.
 Montenegro, Pedro Paulo (1974). A Teoria Literária na Obra de Araripe Júnior. Rio de Janeiro: Tempo Brasileiro.
 Souza, Ricardo Luiz de (2007). "Abandonando a Europa: Araripe Júnior e a Identidade Nacional," Estudos de Sociologia, Vol. 12, No. 22, pp. 11–26.

External links
 Works by Araripe Júnior, at Hathi Trust
 Works by Araripe Júnior, at Brasiliana
 Araripe Júnior: Um Taine às Avessas?
 Araripe Júnio e a Crítica Literária

1848 births
1911 deaths
Brazilian literary critics
Brazilian male novelists
Brazilian people of Portuguese descent
Members of the Brazilian Academy of Letters
People from Ceará
19th-century Brazilian novelists
20th-century Brazilian novelists
19th-century Brazilian male writers
20th-century Brazilian male writers